Flying Casanovas was a documentary on PBS about the different ways birds try to mate. Flying Casanovas was originally broadcast in 2001.

External links
PBS - Flying Casanovas
 

2001 American television episodes
American documentary television films
Nova (American TV program) episodes
2000s American films